Housebound may refer to:

 Housebound (2000 film), an American thriller film directed by Mari Kornhauser
 Housebound (2014 film), a New Zealand horror comedy film directed by Gerard Johnstone
 the state of being under house arrest
 Home care supported living